Kolahoi Peak (locally called 'Gashe-braer' meaning the goddess of light) is a mountain with a peak elevation of  located in Anantnag district, Jammu and Kashmir, India. The mountain is the highest mountain in Kashmir Division. Kolahoi Peak is easily accessible through Aru valley and lies in the vicinity of Sonamarg in Ganderbal district. Kolahoi Peak is part of the Great Himalayan range, and is located 21 km north of Aru near Pahalgam. To its north flows the Sind River, while the Lidder River originates from the glacier located on the mountain and flows south.

Kolahoi Peak rises from the Kolahoi Glacier is a pyramid-shaped peak with ice falls and ice fields at its bottom. The rock formation of the peak is extraordinary stable with aretes and ridges.

Climbing history and routes
Kolahoi Peak was first climbed by a British medical team headed by Dr Ernest Neve in 1912.

The easiest route to climb Kolahoi Peak is its southern face via the Aru village near Pahalgam, from which a 21 km high altitude alpine trek leads to the glacier of the peak. A shorter but more difficult 15 km trek from Sonamarg via the Sarbal Nallah is also possible.

On 7 September 2018, a team of mountaineers while descending after successful summit were hit by rockfall debris, which killed two of them.

Kolahoi Glacier 

Kolahoi Glacier is a valley glacier in the northwestern Himalayan Range situated 26 kilometers north from Pahalgam and 16 kilometers south from Sonamarg, in the union territory of Jammu and Kashmir.

The origin of the glacier is below the cirques on the north flank of Kolahoi Peak. It is the main source of Lidder River, whose water serves the population of Anantnag district, where it is mainly used for drinking and agricultural purposes. It finally drains into the Jhelum River near Khanabal, Anantnag.

Kolahoi Glacier is among the victims of global warming, and has shrunk in area from 13.57 km2 in 1963 to 10.69 km2 in 2005 or a loss of 2.88 km2 in three decades. In 1974 the glacier was about 5 km long and is known to have extended for at least 35 km during the Pleistocene.  A detailed  analysis by Rafiq and Mishra reported that the glacier has shrunk from 35 to 09.88 Sq Km. The rate of recession measured from 1922 to 2015 is reported to be 73.26 m per year. Furthermore, the rate of recession of snout is found to be 16.41 m per year from 1857 to 2015. The shirking of glacier area is linked to reduction in snow depth which in turn is affected by the increase in black carbon concentration, temperature and reduction in precipitation. Reanalysis data show that there is decrease of about 1.08 ± 0.65 cm per decade in snow depth over Kolahoi glacier during 1979 to 2013. There are decadal increasing trends of about 76 nanogram/m2 (statistically significant) and 0.39 °C (insignificant) in black carbon concentration and temperature, respectively, over Kolahoi. A decreasing trend of about 2.9 mm/month per decade in precipitation over the study area is also reported. It is reported that there is decrease of about 71 ± 24% in snow depth for each degree increase in temperature over Kolahoi. Reduction in snow depth as a result of increase in black carbon concentration, temperature and reduction in precipitation might have resulted in the shrinking of the Kolahoi glacier. According to another report, Kolahoi is a hanging glacier and hollowed inside. It is a matter of great concern for Kashmir Valley. Many expeditions have failed here.

Notes

See also

 Sonamarg
 Gulmarg
 Pahalgam
 Yusmarg
 Kukernag
 Gangabal
 Aharabal
 Kolahoi Peak
 Hirpora Wildlife Sanctuary

References 

Mountains of Jammu and Kashmir
Anantnag district
Five-thousanders of the Himalayas